This is a list of major roads in Ottawa, Ontario, Canada:

Airport Parkway 
Albert Street 
Albion Road 
Alta Vista Drive 
Anderson Road 
Aviation Parkway 
Bank Street 
Bankfield Road 
Baseline Road 
Beechwood Avenue 
Blair Road 
Booth Street 
Boundary Road 
Bridge Street
Bronson Avenue 
Brookfield Road 
Cambrian Road 
Cameron Street 
Campeau Drive 
Carling Avenue 
Carp Road 
Carp View Road 
Castlefrank Road 
Catherine Street 
Cedarview Road 
Century Road
Chamberlain Avenue 
Charlotte Street 
Clyde Avenue 
Colonel By Drive 
Colonial Road 
Conroy Road 
Coventry Road 
Corkstown Road 
Craig Side Road
Dalmeny Road 
Devine Road 
Dilworth Road 
Donald B. Munro Drive 
Donnelly Drive 
Dunning Road 
Dunrobin Road 
Dwyer Hill Road 
Eagleson Road 
Earl Armstrong Road 
Elgin Street 
Fallowfield Road 
Fernbank Road 
Ferry Road 
Fisher Avenue 
Flewellyn Road 
Fourth Line Road 
Frank Kenny Road 
Franktown Road 
Galetta Side Road 
Gladstone Avenue 
Greenbank Road 
Gregoire Road 
Harbour Street 
Hawthorne Avenue
Hawthorne Road 
Hazeldean Road 
Hemlock Road 
Heron Road 
Highway 7 
Highland Road
Highway 174 
Highway 417 
Hog's Back Road 
Holly Acres Road 
Hope Side Road 
Hunt Club Road 
Huntley Road 
Huntmar Drive 
Industrial Avenue 
Innes Road 
Island Park Drive 
Jeanne d'Arc Boulevard 
Jockvale Road 
Katimavik Road 
Kent Street 
Kinburn Side Road 
King Edward Avenue 
Kirkwood Avenue 
Laurier Avenue 
Lees Avenue 
Leitrim Road 
Lester Road 
Limebank Road 
Lyon Street 
Mackenzie Avenue 
Madawaska Boulevard 
Main Street 
Maitland Avenue 
Manotick Main Street 
March Road 
Marvelville Road 
McArthur Avenue 
McBean Street 
Meadowlands Drive 
Mer Bleue Road 
Merivale Road 
Metcalfe Street 
Milton Road 
Mitch Owens Road 
Montreal Road 
Moodie Drive 
Munster Road 
Murray Street 
Navan Road 
NCC Scenic Driveway 
Nicholas Street 
O'Connor Street 
Ogilvie Road 
Old Montreal Road 
Old Prescott Road 
Orléans Boulevard 
Osgoode Main Street 
Ottawa Road 29 
Ottawa Street (Richmond) 
Palladium Drive 
Panmure Road 
Parkdale Avenue 
Perth Street 
Pinecrest Road 
Preston Street 
Prince of Wales Drive 
Queen Elizabeth Driveway 
Queensway 
Ramsayville Road 
Richmond Road 
Rideau Street 
Rideau Valley Drive 
River Road 
Riverside Drive 
Robertson Road 
Rockdale Road 
Roger Stevens Drive 
Russland Road 
Russell Road 
Saumure Road 
Sir George-Étienne Cartier Parkway 
Sir John A. Macdonald Parkway 
St. Joseph Boulevard 
St. Laurent Boulevard 
St. Patrick Street 
Scott Street 
Slater Street 
Smith Road 
Smyth Road 
Snake Island Road 
Somerset Street 
Sparks Street 
Stagecoach Road 
Strandherd Drive 
Sussex Drive 
Tenth Line Road 
Terry Fox Drive 
Timm Drive 
Thomas A. Dolan Parkway 
Thomas Argue Road 
Trail Road 
Trim Road 
Vanier Parkway 
Veterans Memorial Highway (416) 
Victoria Street 
Walkley Road 
Waller Street 
Wellington Street 
Woodroffe Avenue

Classification
The City of Ottawa classifies its roads in one of the following categories:

  City freeway
  Arterial road
  Major collector road
  Collector road
  Local road

 signifies roads under federal government jurisdiction.

 A King's Highway sign indicates a provincial road. (See Highways in Ontario for more information.)

Roads without an identifying icon are of unconfirmed classification.

See also

List of numbered roads in Ottawa
List of Gatineau roads
Capital Pathway

References
Ottawa 2020 Transportation Master Plan (see roads in Maps 6 through 9)

 
Roads
Ottawa